Banksia meisneri subsp. ascendens, commonly known as Scott River banksia, is a subspecies of Banksia meisneri. It is native to the Southwest Botanical Province of Western Australia.

References

 
 
 

meisneri subsp. ascendens
Eudicots of Western Australia
Plant subspecies